The  is a private distance learning university with headquarters in Iwatsuki-ku, Saitama, Saitama, Japan, established in 2000. It has a satellite campus in Chiyoda, Tokyo. The predecessor of the university, Tokyo Chiropractic School, was founded in 1953.

References

External links
 

1953 establishments in Japan
Educational institutions established in 1953
Private universities and colleges in Japan
University of Human Arts and Sciences
Universities and colleges in Tokyo